Charles Thomas Dobson (January 10, 1944 – November 30, 2021) was an American professional baseball player who played nine seasons for the Kansas City / Oakland Athletics and the California Angels of Major League Baseball.

Life and career
Dobson played college baseball for the University of Kansas. He represented the United States in baseball at the 1964 Summer Olympics as a demonstration sport, one of seven pitchers on the team.

He made his Major League debut for the Kansas City Athletics on April 19, 1966. This marked the first time that a starting pitcher made "his big league debut in his team's home opener in the state in which he was born". This feat was repeated 51 years later by Kyle Freeland of the Colorado Rockies. In 1970, Dobson earned a career-high 16 wins and threw five shutouts, tying with Jim Palmer and Gaylord Perry for the major league lead. Despite a 15–5 record in 1971, Dobson experienced significant pain in his pitching elbow due to growing calcium deposits. Surgery that off-season kept him out of the majors throughout 1972. Although he returned to the majors for brief stints in 1973 and 1974, his career was effectively ended by the elbow injury.

Dobson died on November 30, 2021, at the age of 77.

References

External links

Baseball Gauge
Retrosheet
Venezuelan Professional Baseball League

1944 births
2021 deaths
American expatriate baseball players in Mexico
Baseball players from Kansas City, Missouri
Birmingham A's players
Birmingham Barons players
Bradenton Explorers players
California Angels players
Florida Instructional League Athletics players
Kansas City Athletics players
Kansas Jayhawks baseball players
Leones del Caracas players
American expatriate baseball players in Venezuela
Lewiston Broncs players
Major League Baseball pitchers
Mexican League baseball pitchers
Oakland Athletics players
Salt Lake City Angels players
Salt Lake City Gulls players
Tigres del México players
Tucson Toros players
University of Kansas alumni